The Wonderful World of Cease A Leo is the only solo album by rapper and Junior M.A.F.I.A. member Lil' Cease. It was released on July 13, 1999 through Atlantic Records and was mainly produced by members of The Hitmen. The album proved successful and peaked at number 26 on the Billboard 200 and number 3 on the Top R&B/Hip-Hop Albums, and also featured the single "Play Around", which made it to number 52 on the Hot R&B/Hip-Hop Singles & Tracks and number 9 on the Hot Rap Singles.

Track listing

Samples used
"More Dangerous" contains a sample from "Warning" by The Notorious B.I.G.
"Get Out Our Way" contains samples from "Now That You're Gone" by Diana Ross and "Cherish the Day" by Sade.
"Future Sport" contains a sample from "More Funky Stuff" by Kool & the Gang.
"Lookin' for a Lady" contains a sample from "Big Stars" by Ronnie Laws.
"Long Time Comin" contains a sample from "Zungguzungguzungguzeng" by Yellowman.
"Girlfriend" contains samples from "Not Gonna Hold On" by R. Kelly and "Be Happy" by Mary J. Blige.
"Chicken Heads" contains samples from "The Mood" by Kashif and "A Little Bit of Love Is All It Takes" by New Edition.
"4 My Niggaz" contains a samples from "Trans-Europe Express" by Kraftwerk, "Al-Naafiysh" by Hashim  and  "Computer Game" by Yellow Magic Orchestra.
"Work It Out" contains a sample from "We Had to Break Away" by Twennynine and Lenny White.
"Mr. Nasty" contains samples from "Super Hoe" by Boogie Down Productions and "Super Sporm" by Captain Sky.
"Everything" contains a sample from "You Are Everything" by The Stylistics.
"Don't Stop" contains a sample from "Knowledge Me" by Original Concept.

References 

1999 debut albums
Atlantic Records albums